Sean T. Hanna (born December 31, 1961) is an American politician who represented the 130th district in the New York State Assembly from 2011 to 2012. His district included portions of Livingston, Monroe and Ontario Counties.

Shortly after graduating law school, he joined the Monroe County District Attorney's Office, where he served as a felony trial prosecutor for six years.

In 1995, Hanna was elected to the Monroe County Legislature. His colleagues soon elected him Deputy Majority Leader. His eight-year tenure in the county legislature ended when then-Governor George Pataki made Hanna the Avon-based New York State Department of Environmental Conservation Regional Director for the 11 county area enveloping Rochester the Finger Lakes and Corning/Elmira.

Hanna announced in 2012 that he would not seek re-election for a second term in the Assembly, and instead would run for the New York State Senate's 55th district. He lost to Democrat Ted O'Brien in the 2012 general election.

Hanna served as a lead trial attorney for Monroe County Executive Maggie Brooks' administration before his election to the New York State Assembly. He earned his bachelor's degree in Economics from Boston College, and his Juris Doctor degree from Wake Forest University School of Law.

He is a co-founder and co-owner of True North Packaging, Inc. in Webster, NY, and is the Chief Strategic Officer at All-American Home Care in Rochester, NY.

He resides with his wife and two children in Webster, New York.

References

External links
New York State Assembly website

1961 births
Living people
Republican Party members of the New York State Assembly
Morrissey College of Arts & Sciences alumni
Wake Forest University School of Law alumni
21st-century American politicians